The NAIA Men's Swimming and Diving Championships comprise the annual swim meet held to determine the national champions of men's NAIA collegiate swimming and diving in the United States and Canada. It has been held each year since 1957.

The most successful program is Simon Fraser, with 17 NAIA national titles.

Keiser (FL) are the reigning national champions, having won their third national title in 2020.

Results

Champions

Team titles

 Schools highlight in yellow have reclassified athletics from the NAIA.

Records

Yards

Meters

See also
 List of college swimming and diving teams
NAIA Women's Swimming and Diving Championships
NCAA Men's Swimming and Diving Championships (Division I, Division II, Division III)
NCAA Women's Swimming and Diving Championships (Division I, Division II, Division III)

References

External links 
NAIA Men's Swimming and Diving
NAIA Men's Swimming Championship History

National swimming competitions
NAIA championships